Southern Kaduna (formerly Southern Zaria) is an area inhabited by various non-Hausa peoples living south of Zaria Emirate of Kaduna State. It is located in the Middle Belt region of Nigeria. Southern Kaduna consist of 12 local Government out of Kaduna State 23 Local Government. Some view it as being less of a geographical identity and more of an ethnic identity concept.

Subdivisions

 Chikun
 Jaba
 Jema'a
 Kachia
 Kaduna South
 Kagarko
 Kajuru
 Kaura
 Kauru
 Lere
 Sanga
 Zangon Kataf

Ethnic composition
Southern Kaduna is composed of closely related ethnic groups and several subgroups united by a common culture and history. James (2000) classified these people based on their ethno-linguistic affinities under the topic "The Middle Belt (Composition of the Nok Culture Area)", and grouping the subgroups into the following groups:  the Southern kaduna population is estimated to be over 4.5 million people out of the estimated 8.5 million population in Kaduna state in 2016. Predicted 5.1 million people out of 12 million predicted population of Kaduna State in 2021. The common general language speaking in the area is Hausa Language as medium of communication.

The Proto-Plateau ethnolinguistic cluster
I. Northern or Adara Group
 Adara (Kadara)
 Ada (Kuturmi)
 Ajure Adara (Kadara of Idon)
 Anumafa Adara (Kadara Kateri)
 Semi Ajure (Ankuwa, Gora)
 Bakulu (Ikulu)

II. Western or Koro Group
 Koro Myamya
 Koro Achel, Ashe or Wachi
 Koro Ala or Agweshi
 Koro Ham or Adong/Gbaham

III. Ham or Northwestern Group
 Ham Kpop (Jaba Kwoi)
 Ham Ngat Ham (Jaban Katari)
 Ham Shambang (Samban)
 Ham Duhyah (Jaban Lungu)
 Ham Gwong (Kagoma)
 Ham Kworri (Chori)
 Ham Det (Faik/Kenyi)
 Ham Netkun/Netwho - Gbaham
 Ham Nyakpah (Yeskwa)
 Ham Kong/Rhuini (Kamantan)

IV. Nerzit or Kataf (Atyap) Group
 Atyap (Kataf, Katab)
 Bajju (Kaje)
 Agworok (Aegworok, Oegworok, Kagoro)
 Asholyio (Osholio, Asholio, Moro'a)
 Fantswam (Kafanchan)
 Bakulu (Ikulu)
 Anghan (Angan, Kamantan)
 Atakad (Atakat, Attakar)
 Atyecharak (Atyacherak, Attachirak, Kachechere)
 Terri (Challa, Chara)
 Atuku (tuku) Kuu""

V. South-western (Aninka) Group
 Ninzo
 Northern Mada
 Gbantu (Gwantu)
 Nindem
 Nikyob (Kaninkon)
 Kanufi
 Nungu
 Buh - Ayu
 Ningeshe
 Nandu
 Numana

The above grouping on the Proto-Plateau ethnolinguistic clusters was however modified based on the spoken languages by Blench (2008) as follows:

I. Northwest or Adara Group
Eda, Ada
Edra, Adara
Bakulu
Ẹjẹgha (Idon)
Doka
Ẹhwa (Iku-Gora-Ankwe)

II. Atyap (Nerzit, Nenzit) Group
Bajju
Atyap
Agworok (Kagoro)
Takad (Attakar)
Atyecarak (Kacicere)
Asholyio
Fantswam (Kafancan)
Atuku (Tuku) Kuu

III. Koro Group
Ashe
Tinɔr (Waci-Myamya)
Idũ, Gwara
Nyenkpa-Barde

IV. Ham Group
Shamang
Cori
Ham
Zhire
Shang

V. Gwong Group
Gwong (Kagoma)
Anɡhan (Kamanton)

VI. Ninzo Group
Ninzo (Ninzam)
Bu-Niŋkada
Mada
Numana-Nunku-Gbantu-Numbu
Ningye-Ninka
Anib
Nikyob
Nindem
Nungu
Ayu

VII. Ndun Group
Ndun (Nandu)

VIII. Alumu Group
Sambe
He also said that Nisam is a presumed Plateau language once spoken in Nince Village, Kaduna State, however, its place within the Plateau branch cannot be ascertained due to the lack of linguistic data and that in 2005, there was only one speaker of Nisam.

The Proto-Kainji ethnolinguistic cluster

I. Eastern Kainji Group I
 Atsam (Chawai)
 Amap (Amo)
 Abisi (Piti)
 Kuzamani (Shuwa-Zamani)
 Ngmgbang (Ribam)
 Dinani (Dingi)
 Ribina

II. Eastern Kainji Group II
 Agbiri (Gure)
 Aniragu (Kahugu)
 Akurmi (Kurama)
 Koonu (Kono)
 Vono (Kiballo)
 Tumi (Kitimi)
 Nuno-Kaivi (Kaibi)
 Mala-Ruma (Rumaya/Ruruma)
 Abin (Binawa)
 Kuvori (Surubu)
 Atumu (Kinuku)
 Shuwa-Zamani (Kuzamani)
 Dungi (Dungu)

The Proto-Nupoid ethnolinguistic cluster
 Gbagyi (Gwari) Group
 Gbagyi-Gbari (Gwari)

The Proto-West Chadic ethnolinguistic cluster
Outside of James (2000)'s classification lie the groups from the Proto-West Chadic ethnolinguistic cluster:

 Gwandara (an afro-asiatic group, related to the Hausa, said to have migrated from Kano.)
Sha (a migrant group from Bokkos, Plateau State.)

Languages 
Southern Kaduna consists of a diverse minority of ethnolinguistic groups, who speak languages belonging to the Niger–Congo and West Chadic language groups. Below are the languages and dialects spoken by the people of Southern Kaduna:

Natural resources
Former Nigerian Minister of Solid Minerals, Leslie Obiora, compiled a list of minerals across the country, which amounted to a total of 74 minerals;  34 were declared fit for mining on a commercial scale, with Southern Kaduna having over 30 minerals with over fifty percent (50%) of them minable.

Agriculture

In the 1990s, ginger farmers enjoyed profit from the sales of their harvested crops due to the availability of ginger processing companies all over the region, but today, most of those companies have shut down without efforts to revive them on the side of the government.

Education

It was asserted by Kazah-Toure (1999:130) that Southern Kaduna took a lead in education in the defunct Northern Region, during the period around the Nigerian Civil War (between 1966 and 1970s). Bonat (1989:55) claims that a majority of the educated people from this region who are non-Hausa, were in the teaching profession and in the middle cadre of the civil service in contrast to the Hausa who were dominant at the highest bureaucratic levels.

Present tertiary institutions
 Air Force Institute of Technology (Nigeria), Kaduna
 Greenfield University, Kaduna
 Kaduna Polytechnic, Kaduna
 Kaduna State University, Kaduna and Kafanchan Campuses
 National Open University of Nigeria, Gworok Study Center
 Nigerian Defence Academy (NDA), Kaduna
 Kaduna State College of Education, Kafanchan
 School of Agricultural Technology, Nuhu Bamalli Polytechnic, Cenkwon
 College of Nursing, Kafanchan

Notable people

See also
 1992 Zangon Kataf crises
 2019 Kaduna State massacre
 Afan National Festival
 Atyap Chiefdom
 Kafanchan Peace Declaration
 Kajuru Castle
 List of villages in Kaduna State
 Matsirga waterfalls
 Nok culture
 Railway stations in Nigeria
Southern Kaduna Crisis

References

External links

Kaduna State
Society of Nigeria